Tece Castle is a ruined castle in Mersin Province, southern Turkey.

Location
Although it is close to the state highway , it is difficult to visit the castle by motor vehicle because it is situated in a citrus plantation.

History
There is no record about the origin of the castle. However, judging from the architecture, it was probably a late Roman or a Byzantine castle. It was a low elevation castle, and it was built to control the road running parallel to the Mediterranean Sea coast. It was also used by the Crusades and Armenian Kingdom of Cilicia, during which the castle underwent renovation.

In June 1981 the American archaeologist and art historian Dr. Robert W. Edwards conducted a formal survey of this site and drew the following conclusions.  The rectangular circuit wall and the fragments of its seven small towers were so badly decayed that it was impossible without a formal excavation to deduce the date of construction.  However, the surviving portion of the three-storey estate house (keep) is primarily from one period of construction with masonry and architectural features identical to those used during the 12th and 13th centuries in the Armenian Kingdom of Cilicia.  It is similar to the nearby medieval site of Kız near the Durak railway station.  These sites were built by Armenian masons, perhaps for Crusader occupants.

Architecture
Most of the buildings are ruined. The only partially standing building is a three-story donjon. The masonry of the inner walls is of ashlar blocks and the outer walls of bossage blocks. The 1981 survey was conducted under the auspices of the University of California at Berkeley.

References

Mersin
Castles in Mersin Province
Mezitli District
Ruined castles in Turkey
Byzantine fortifications in Turkey